Land of Hope is a 1986 Australian mini series that tells the story of the Australian Labor Party through the eyes of the fictional Quinn family over four generations.  It was produced by the Seven Network.

Cast

 Maureen Green as Young Maureen Quinn
 Patricia Kennedy as Old Maureen Quinn
 Patrick Dickson as Paddy Quinn
 Benjamin Franklin as Kevin Quinn
 Penelope Stewart as Young Nesta Quinn
 Melissa Jaffer as Old Nesta Quinn
 Drew Forsythe as Old Frank Quinn
 Melita Jurisic as Kathleen Quinn
 Peter Kowitz as Leo Quinn
 Richard Moir as Dominic Quinn
 Mark Owen-Taylor as Andrew Quinn
 Helen Buday as Sarah Quinn
 Heather Mitchell as Helen Davies
 Christopher Dibb as Tom Mann

References

External links
Land of Hope at IMDb

1980s Australian television miniseries
1986 Australian television series debuts
1986 Australian television series endings
1986 television films
1986 films
English-language television shows